Giuseppe Daniele (19 March 1955 – 4 January 2015), known as Pino Daniele, was an Italian singer, songwriter and musician. His influences covered a wide number of genres, including pop, blues, jazz, and Italian and Middle Eastern music.

Biography 

Daniele was born to a working-class family in Naples, his father being a harbor worker. A self-taught guitarist, he began his career as a musician playing for other successful singers of the 1970s. His debut in the Italian music world was in 1977 with the album Terra mia, which proved to be a successful mix of Neapolitan tradition and Blues sounds. Daniele defined his music with the term "tarumbò", which indicated a mix of tarantella, blues and rumba. His lyrics also attracted critical praise: written and sung in an intense Neapolitan, they contained strong and bitter accusations against the social injustices of Naples, as well as Italian society in general, and included melancholic personal themes. Several of the later songs are characterized by a free intermingling of English, Italian and Neapolitan passages.

Daniele's talent was confirmed on the following album Pino Daniele (1979). He scored his greatest success in 1980, with Nero a metà ("Half-Black Skinned"), which was noted by some authorities as the hallmark of the rebirth of Neapolitan song. In that year Daniele opened the Bob Marley concert at the San Siro stadium in Milan. In 1981 Vai Mo was released. The presence of some of the most renowned musicians of the Neapolitan musical milieu, including James Senese, Enzo Avitabile, Tullio De Piscopo and Tony Esposito, as session men on his albums has also been widely praised.

In 1982, Daniele shifted to a personal and early version of world music: in Bella 'mbriana musicians such as Alphonso Johnson and Wayne Shorter appeared as guest players. In the following year Daniele held a concert in Havana, and later formed a Latin-American band. In 1983 Daniele collaborated with the American singer/guitarist Richie Havens on Common Ground, an album written and played together. His interest in Arabic music is emphasized on Bonne Soirée (1987), while the subsequent Schizzechea With Love (1988) was more Mediterranean-oriented. In the same year he started a collaboration with the Italian actor and director Massimo Troisi: Daniele completed the soundtracks for Troisi's films Le vie del Signore sono finite and Pensavo fosse amore invece era un calesse.

Non calpestare i fiori nel deserto, released in Spring 1995, is an attempt to revive inspiration through African and Ethnic influences, and sold more than 800,000 copies. The subsequent tour ended with a double date with Jazz guitarist Pat Metheny.

In 2010, Daniele played at Crossroads Guitar Festival, called by his friend Eric Clapton at Toyota Park in Chicago, playing with Joe Bonamassa and Robert Randolph. In 2011, he performed in concert with Clapton at Cava de' Tirreni stadium.

Daniele died of a heart attack on 4 January 2015, at Sant'Eugenio Hospital in Rome.

Covers 

Many artists recorded cover versions of Pino Daniele's songs: among others, Sarah Jane Morris (Alleria on album Cello Song), Randy Crawford (in English It's Raining, on album Through the Eyes of Love), Patricia Marx (in Portuguese , on album Charme do mundo), Marisa Monte (E po' che fa, in Portuguese Bem que se quis, on album MM), and Issac Delgado (Quando, on album Malecon).

Discography

Studio albums

Compilation albums

Live Albums

Soundtracks
 1988 – Le vie del Signore sono finite (album)|Le vie del Signore sono finite (EMI Italiana, 50 7900981)

Singles

References

External links 

 
 
 
 

1955 births
2015 deaths
20th-century Italian guitarists
20th-century Italian composers
20th-century Italian singers
21st-century Italian guitarists
21st-century Italian composers
21st-century Italian singers
EMI Records artists
Italian male guitarists
Italian male singers
Italian male singer-songwriters
Italian multi-instrumentalists
Italian jazz guitarists
Italian jazz singers
Italian pop guitarists
Italian pop rock singers
Italian pop singers
Italian rock guitarists
Italian rock singers
Nastro d'Argento winners
Musicians from Naples
Polydor Records artists
Singers from Naples
Ciak d'oro winners